The 2019 IBSF World Snooker Championship was an amateur snooker tournament that took place in 2019 in Antalya.

The women's tournament was won by Ng On-yee, who defeated Nutcharut Wongharuthai 5–2 in the final.

Tournament Details
The 2019 IBSF World Snooker Championship was an amateur snooker tournament that was held from 29 October to 9 November 2019 at the Starlight Resort Hotel in Antalya. Qualifying group matches happened from 29 October to 5 November. The top three players from each group qualified for the knockout stage, which started with two first round matches on 6 November. The last 16 matches were held on 7 November, the quarter-finals and semi-finals on 8 November, and the final on 9 November.

Ng On-yee won her third IBSF world snooker title, nine years after her second. In the final, she beat Nutcharut Wongharuthai 5–2, after trailing 0–2. Ng dedicated her title win to Poon Ching-chiu, a snooker player who had died at the age of 18 in the fortnight before the final. Ng finished top of the qualifying round, winning all four of her matches 2–0. She then beat Joy Lyn Willenberg 3–0 in the last 16 and Amee Kamani 4–1 in the quarter-final. In the semi-final she was taken to the deciding frame by defending champion Waratthanun Sukritthanes, but with breaks of 34 and 40, won the last frame 85–0 and the match 4–3.

The three highest  of the tournament were 91, 81 and 78, all by reigning IBSF Under-21 snooker champion Bai Yulu.

Results

Group Round
Source: ibsf.info

The top three players from each group qualified for the knockout stages.

Group A

Group B

Group C

Group D

Group E

Group F

Knockout rounds
Source: ibsf.info

Seedings are shown in the box to the left of the player's name. Match winners are in bold.

Final
Source: Online scoresheet for the match.

References

External links
Final. Ng On Yee vs Nutcharat Wongharuthai (YouTube)

2019 in snooker
Snooker amateur tournaments
International sports competitions hosted by Turkey
Snook
October 2019 sports events in Turkey
November 2019 sports events in Turkey
Snooker
2019 in Turkish women's sport